Lavinia was the daughter of Latinus and Amata in Roman mythology.

Lavinia may also refer to:

Biology
 Lavinia (fish), a genus of cyprinid fish containing the hitches
 Eulavinia, a monotypic genus of moths formerly known as Lavinia

Fictional characters
 Lavinia Andronicus, a character in Shakespeare's tragedy Titus Andronicus
 Lavinia Arguelles, a fictional character in the television series Bituing Walang Ningning
 Lavinia Herbert, a character in the novel A Little Princess
 Gargouille (comics), aka Lavinia LeBlanc, a member of the Marvel Comics Acolytes
 Lavinia Whateley, a character in the short story The Dunwich Horror
 Lavinia Mannon, a character in Eugene O'Neill's Mourning Becomes Electra
 Lavinia Richter, a character in the FX anthology series American Horror Story 
 Lavinia Swire, a character in the British costume drama Downton Abbey
 Lavinia, a character in George Bernard Shaw's play Androcles and the Lion
 Lavinia, a character in the book The Letter for the King, its sequel, movie adaptation and TV adaptation.

Places
 Dehiwala-Mount Lavinia, Sri Lanka
 Lavínia, São Paulo, Brazil
 Lavinia State Reserve, a protected area in Australia
 Lavinia, Iowa, United States
 Lavinia, Minnesota, United States
 Lavinia, Tennessee, United States

Other uses
 Lavinia (novel), a 2008 novel by Ursula K. Le Guin about the mythological Lavinia
 Lavinia (song), a 2003 song and single by The Veils
 HMS Lavinia, an 1806 frigate of the Royal Navy

People with the given name

First name
 Lavinia Blackwall, member of the Scottish folk rock group Trembling Bells (formed 2008)
 Lavinia Burnett (1785–1845), first woman to be executed in the state of Arkansas
 Lavinia Byrne (born 1948), Roman Catholic former nun
 Lavinia Crosse (19th century), founder of the Community of All Hallows
 Lavinia Fenton (1708–1760), English actress
 Lavinia Fisher (1793–1820), first female serial killer in the United States of America
 Lavinia Fitzalan-Howard, Duchess of Norfolk (1916–1995), British peeress
 Lavinia Fontana (1552–1614), Italian painter
 Lavinia Stella Goodwin (1833-1911), American author, educator
 Lavinia Greenlaw (born 1962), English poet and novelist
 Lavinia Malcolm (c.1847–1920), Scottish suffragist, politician, first Scottish woman female councillor and first female Lord Provost
 Lavinia Meijer (born 1983), Dutch harpist
 Lavinia Miloșovici (born 1976), Romanian Olympic gymnast
 Livinia Nixon, Australian TV personality
 Lavinia Padarath (21st century), Fijian politician
 Lavinia Ryves (1797–1871), impostor pretender
 Lavinia Stan (born 1966), Romanian and Canadian political scientist
 Lavinia Șandru (born 1975), Romanian politician
 Lavinia Tagane (born 1991), Wallisian politician 
 Lavinia Veiongo (1879–1902), Queen consort of Tonga
 Lavínia Vlasak (born 1976), Brazilian actress
 Lavinia Warner (20th century), British television producer
 Lavinia Warren (1841–1919), American dwarf
 Lavinia Williams (1916–1989), African-American dancer and dance educator

Middle name
 Emma Lavinia Gifford (1840–1912), first wife of the poet Thomas Hardy

See also
 
 Lavin (disambiguation)

Genus disambiguation pages
Romanian feminine given names